Hameed Al Husseinie College is an Islamic national school in Colombo, Sri Lanka, founded in 1884  is the First Muslim Boys School in Sri Lanka.

History
The college began as a school, the Al Madrasathul Khairiyyathul Islamiah. Founded by Marhoom Sidde Lebbe Image, Marhoom Wapichi Marikkar and Ahmed Urabi Pasha, Marhoom Ahmed Orabi Pasha, at the school's opening ceremony on 15 November 1884 (First Muslim School in Sri Lanka), Ahmed Orabi made a speech on the importance of the new school to Sri Lanka's Muslim community.
The Muslim community was not willing to enter into the modern education system introduced in the 19th century, for several reasons. One was that most of the schools were established and controlled by the Christian missionaries. The traditional and conservative Muslims had the fear that English education may lead their children to Christianity, as they witnessed in Sinhalese and Tamil communities.[3] Hence, Siddi Lebbe wanted to establish separate schools for Muslims as did the Buddhist and Hindu revivalists. His dream was realised in November 1884 with the establishment of the first Muslim English school in this country - 'AL Madurasathul Khairiyyatul Islamiah' in Colombo.

In 1901, Noordeen Hadjiar, trustee of the Grand Mosque, built a new building for the school using his own funds as a monument to the Silver Jubilee Celebrations of Abdul Hamid II, the Ottoman Sultan, and renamed the school Al Madrasathul Hameediah.  In the same year a farewell ceremony was held for Orabi at the school premises to mark his departure from Ceylon to Egypt. In 1921, the school was again renamed as Hameediah Boys' English School.

During this same period, The Ceylon Moslem Educational Society Ltd. was founded in 1919 with the objective of looking after the educational needs of the Muslim community. The first school founded by the society was in Hulftsdrop Street and was called Akbar School. Later the members of the society bought the property at 45 Husseiniya Street (then called Kuruwe Street) and the school was shifted there in 1919 and named Husseinie Boys’ English School.

The school was amalgamated in 1961 with the nearby Husseinie Boys' English School under the new name Hameed Al Husseinie Maha Vidyalaya by Badiudin Mahmud, the Minister of Education. On 29 August 1972, government ministers Pieter Keuneman and Badiudin Mahmud visited the school and unveiled a new five-storey building block and a three-storey science section. These buildings were completed in 1982 and the then Prime Minister Ranasinghe Premadasa visited the school and declared it open on 3 June 1982 by the invitation of then Minister of Education Ranil Wickremasinghe.

The school was officially granted college status in 1991, and was renamed Hameed Al Husseinie College. It was elevated to a National School on 26 July 1996.

To remark the school 125th years, a stamp (Rs. 5/=) was released 30 July 2009 at the college premises.

Founding Fathers

Marhoom M. C. Siddi Lebbe 
Marhoom Mohammado Cassim Siddi Lebbe  was one of the founding fathers of Hameed Al Husseinie College, along with Marhoom Wapichi Marikar and Marhoom Orabi Pasha, initiated to form the First Muslim Boys’ School in 1884 under the name "Al Madrasathul Khariyathul Islamiya". Born on 11 June 1838, M.C. Siddi Lebbe, was a lawyer, educationist, scholar, philosopher, seer, writer, publisher, social reformer and visionary.

Born in Kandy to a family where intellectual and religious pursuits were encouraged, he was determined to follow his father M. L. Siddi Lebbe's footsteps. His father was one of the 1st Ceylonese proctors, and was the Head Moorman of the district in 1833. Siddi Lebbe became a proctor in 1862 at the age of 24. He practiced in the District Court of Kandy as well as the Supreme Court. He was a member of the Kandy Municipal Council representing Ward No. 4 for eight years. He also acted as Municipal Magistrate for four years.

Siddi Lebbe felt that the Muslims should be aroused to realize their sorry state in education. They were educationally backward, economically stagnant, culturally isolated, religiously obscurantist, intellectually sterile and politically insignificant. This he sought to achieve through the Arabic-Tamil weekly, he founded to which he gave the name 'Muslim Naisen'. To uplift the educational needs of the Muslim community, he along with his companions initiated many schools in the island.

Although he was a rich man, at the time of his death, he had either sold or mortgaged the major part of his properties in order to finance these schools. He also started the First Muslim Girl's School in Kandy where his sister was the Head Teacher.

He died on 5 February 1898, the entire Muslim population has paid homage to the inspiring life and work of Marhoom Sidde Lebbe as one of the greatest sons of mother Lanka. It is due to these factors, the Government included the name of Marhoom Sidde Lebbe in the list of National Heroes. In addition, Rs. 1 Stamp was issued on 11 June 1977.

Marhoom Orabi Pasha 
Born in 1841 in Horiyeh, Egypt, Ahmed Orabi (well known as Orabi Pasha) was the peasant son of a village sheikh. After studying at Al-Azhar, he was conscripted to the Army and rose to be a remarkable officer. He was the leader of the National Revolt in Egypt. The discrimination in the Army and mismanagement of the Khedive led to the formation of the National Movement in 1881 under the leadership of Colonel Orabi. They compelled the Khedive to appoint a Revolutionary Government with Orabi as War Minister. Orabi led a national revolt against the injustices of the Turkish ruler Fewfik, who called on the British to protect him.

The Egyptians under Orabi fought gallantly but vainly against the British troops who entered Cairo and occupied Egypt for 70 years. He was arrested and sentenced with six other officers to exile for life in Ceylon.

In a cold and gloomy night, these seven vanquished officers were sent, together with their families by a special train to Suez under stringent precautions. On the next day, 27 December they left Suez in the specially chartered ship SS Mariotis to Ceylon.

On 10 January 1893, the ship Mariotis anchored in the Colombo Harbour. The Muslim Community, who had religious and racial ties with the exiles-gathered in large number to receive the 'Heroes' with garlands. As soon as the leaders landed, the people shouted and followed them in a big demonstration. The Police cleared the way to the carriages prepared to transfer the exiles to their residences. Orabi Pasha was taken to the Lake House and the rest to different places. To each house a Muslim constable was assigned to guard the occupants. Thus was the scenario when they landed in Ceylon.

The Egyptian leaders, expecting that they would spend their whole life in exile, asked for English education for their children. They also established good relations with the prominent Muslim personalities on that time such as Wapichi Marikar  and Sidde Lebbe. Orabi Pasha became very popular among Muslims in the island and he helped Sidde Lebbe and Wapichi Marikar in forming the First Muslim Boys’ School under the name of "Al Madrasathul Khariyathul Islamiya". He himself paid Rs. 100 from his allowances for the salary of the teaching staff of the school.

Orabi Pasha  was so much influential in making the Muslim community to understand the need of better education. He helped the other two in initiating many schools in many parts of the island. Orabi Pasha lived in Colombo until 1892, then moved to Kandy to the house known as 'Arabi House' and stayed there until he was pardoned in 1901.

On May 1901, the final pardon for Orabi Pasha arrived in the island and permitted to return home. A grand farewell gathering was arranged for Orabi Pasha  and his associates at Al Madrasathul Khariyathul Islamiya where wide scale of celebrations were held with recital of prayers of Arabic poems of salutations as well as special prayers for the safe return of the party to their homeland.

On 17 September 1901 the German Ship 'Princess Irene' sailed from Colombo Harbour carrying Orabi Pasha and his family to their motherland Egypt, where he died peacefully on 21 September 1911.

The Orabi Pasha Museum (formally Orabi House) at George E. de Silva Mawatha, Kandy was inaugurated on 13 November 1983 and remembering his yeoman service to the educational needs of the Muslim community, part of Maradana Road was named as Orabi Pasha Road and a 50 cts. Commemorative stamp was released on the same day.

Marhoom Justice M. T. Akbar 
Marhoom Justice M. T. Akbar was the Founding Father of Hussenie Boys’ English School which was later amalgamated with Hameediah Boys’ English School in 1963.

Born in 1880, Justice Akbar, was the first to adore the Supreme Court Bench and he was the first Ceylon Muslim to be raised to the status of a King’s Counsel. At the time of his retirement, he was the senior-most Puisne Justice. Born in a wealthy family, he showed great interest in the educational needs of the Muslim Community as well as Muslim law in the country.

He realised the educational backwardness of the Muslim community formed the Moslem Educational Society Ltd in 1919 and served as the Founder Secretary. During this time, he formed the first Muslim School under the name "Akbar School" in Hulftsdorp. His main intention was to give education to the children of middle class families that refrain their children from going to school due to financial constrains. This paved the way for many families in the close vicinity to send their children to get education.

Later, the Moslem Educational Society Ltd. bought the property at No. 45, then Kuruwe Street (now Husseiniya Street) and shifted the school there and thus the School got its new name Husseinie Boys’ English School. Justice M. T. Akbar died on 22 April 1944. To honour his service to the community, his name adorns one of the Roads in Colombo 02 as Justice Akbar Mawatha.

Marhoom A. M. Wapichi Marikar 
Marhoom Arasy Marikar Wapichi Marikar was another Founding Father of Hameed Al Husseinie College. He gave the major financial support to initiate and to form the First Muslim Boys’ School in 1884 under the name "Al Madrasathul Khariyathul Islamiya". Born in a well to do family during the colonial era, he was one of the major financial contributors as well as principle architectural consultant in building many buildings. He was the main architect of many buildings built during his time such as General Post Office, the Colombo Museum, Colombo Customs, Colombo Town Hall in Pettah, the Galle Face Hotel, Victoria Arcade, etc.

He always thought of his community’s educational, welfare, religious and economical needs and looked out for ways and means to help with the wealth he had. When Marhoom Sidde Lebbe came down from Kandy and started his educational movement in 1880s with a lecture at the Maradana Mosque hall, Wapichi Marikar wholeheartedly joined with Sidde Lebbe and supported him in his activities. This paved the way of bringing up many Muslim schools on that time. He was a pious Muslim who created many mosques and served as a trusty in many mosques and liberally spent his own money for maintaining these mosques. He died on 14 May 1925 at the age of 96.

Principals

Notable alumni

Sports
Sports hold major part of Hameed Al Husseinie College and sporting events are held throughout the year including the Inter-House Sports Festival. The college offers sports such as soccer, cricket, Karate, swimming and boxing. and the most prominent sport is soccer.

Billiards and snooker

MJM Lafir - World Amateur Billiard Champion
The first ever world championship title for any sports won by Sri Lanka. Muhammad Lafir was a past student of HAH College.

Football (soccer)
The college has hosted the annual Invitation Schools Soccer Championship for the Best Deal Trophy since 2007. In 2010 Zahira College, Colombo won the championship, beating St. Benedict's College, Colombo for the second consecutive time. Hameed Al Husseinie College won third place against Zahira College, Mawanella.

Presidents Cup – 2017 
In 2017 The Annual Invitation School Soccer Tournament organised by the G'80 (The OBA Group of 80's) was named "The Presidents Cup" and was held in January under the patronage of President Maithripala Siresena at the Colombo Racecourse Ground. The final was between Hameed Al Husseinie College vs Maris Stella College Negombo where the host Hameed Al Husseinie College Clinched the trophy yet again.

Presidents Cup – 2018 
Presidents Cup 2018 is underway and the tournament started on 25 February 2018 with a Grand Opening Ceremony with the participation of Leading 20 School Football Teams in Sri Lanka at the Colombo Racecourse Ground.
As at 4 March 2018, Zahira College, Colombo and the defending champion Hameed Al Husseinie College, Colombo have ensured their positions in the Grand Finale which is to be held on 18 March 2018 under the flood lights at the Racecourse Ground, Colombo, under the patronage of H.E.Maithripala Siresena the president of Sri Lanka.
The final was held on 18 March 2018 and the Zahira College Colombo become the New Champions after beating Hameed Al Husseinie College 4-3(1-1) in the penalty shootout.

Presidents Cup – 2019 
Presidents Cup 2019 was held between March and April 2019 and Hameed Al Husseinie College emerged as the Champions after beating comprehensively the Al Azhar Central College,Thihariya.

Presidents Cup – 2020

Presidents Cup 2020 is set to be held between 7 March 2020 to 28 March 2020 at the Racecourse Ground Colombo and it was held up at the semifinal stage due to the Covid -19 Pandemic situation. The following schools were selected for the Semifinals to be played

Defending Champions Hameed Al Husseinie College, S.Thomas' College,Mt.Lavinia, Maris Stella College,Negombo and Muslim Central College,Kaluthara.

The Tournament was restarted from the point where it was stopped and Hameed Al Husseinie College once again become the Champions in the Grand Finale held at the Colombo Racecourse on 27 March 2022 against Kalutara Muslim Central College.

Milo Cup All Island Tournament - 2018
The All island Milo Cup under 12 tournament held for the year 2018 and Hameed Al Husseinie College emerged as the Western Province Champions.

Celebration of 60-year winning streak 1957–2017
Hameed Al Husseinie College celebrated its 60 years of excellence with commemoration of its winning streak which started from John Tarbet Shield victory in the final match against Zahira College Colombo in 1957.

Achievements in Soccer

Inter-houses
There are four divisions among the students when it comes to inter-house competition and the names of the houses are as follows.
Yemen colour is :  Yellow
Humaizara colour is :  Blue
Jeelan colour is :  Green
 colour is :  Red

References

External links
 Website of the Old Boys' Association
 
 Facebook page of HAHC
 Facebook page of OBA of HAHC
 Facebook page of G80 Group of HAHC
 Images of commemorative stamps

National schools in Sri Lanka
Schools in Colombo